Canarium kinabaluense is a tree in the family Burseraceae. It is named for Mount Kinabalu in East Malaysia's Sabah state.

Description
The smooth bark is grey.

Distribution and habitat
Canarium kinabaluense is endemic to Borneo.

References

kinabaluense
Endemic flora of Borneo
Trees of Borneo
Plants described in 1955